Markus Wallner (born 27 October 1996) is an Austrian professional footballer who plays as a winger for Horn.

Career
Wallner is a product of the youth academies of USK Obertrum, Red Bull Salzburg and Austria Wien. He began his career with Grödig II in 2013, before moving to Austria Salzburg the following year. in 2016, he returned to Grödig as a senior player. He transferred to Anif in the summer of 2017, and joined Wacker Innsbruck II on loan with an option to buy on 7 February 2019. After his strong performance in his loan, he was purchased by Wacker Innsbruck and was part of their senior squad. On 30 June 2021, he transferred to Tirol in the Austrian Football Bundesliga. He moved to Horn on 9 June 2022.

References

External links
 
 OEFB Profile

1996 births
Living people
Footballers from Salzburg
Austrian footballers
SV Austria Salzburg players
WSG Tirol players
USK Anif players
FC Wacker Innsbruck (2002) players
SV Horn players
Austrian Football Bundesliga players
2. Liga (Austria) players
Austrian Regionalliga players
Association football wingers